The More Things Change... is a 1986 film directed by Robyn Nevin.

Production
Jill Robb initiated the project in 1984 and approached Moya Wood to write the script. Robb had worked with Robyn Nevin making Careful He Might Hear You and hired her as a director. Nevin, who had never directed a film before, made sure she was surrounded by an experienced crew.

Money was raised from 70 investors including the New South Wales Film Corporation. Filming started in late April 1985 in Neerim near Warragul in Victoria.

References

External links

The More Things Change at Oz Movies

Australian drama films
1986 films
1980s English-language films
1980s Australian films